The Mérida Cable Car or Mukumbarí is a cable car system in Venezuela. It is the highest and second longest cable car globally for just 500 meters. Mérida Cable Car is a journey of 12.5 kilometres, reaching an elevation of 4,765 meters, making it an engineering marvel that is one of a kind and has over 40 years of history. The cable car system was opened to the public in 1960; it was closed indefinitely in 2008, declaring that it had reached the end of its service life and would be rebuilt. In 2011, a project of total modernization of the fixed and mechanical infrastructure of the cable car system was launched. In October 2016, a new regular service was inaugurated.

Structure
The Mérida Cable Car comprises four cable cars connected serially, making it easy to move across  and overcome the rugged terrain between the city of Mérida and the Espejo Peak.

Each section of the route has two lanes, and in each lane, there is a cable car that can transport 36 passengers. The cable car moves at a velocity of  thanks to the suspended cable that was run by an engine. There are two different engines: the first is in the La Montaña station which serves to the section between that station and the La Aguada station. The other one is located in the Loma Redonda station and serves the rest of the section

History and administration
This technological achievement emerged from the former Andean Venezuelan Club (Club Andino Venezolano) project in 1952. Its purpose was to make it easier for tourists and Andeans to ascend to the Sierra Nevada de Mérida. The idea was approved by the government. In 1955 topographic studies allowed project's design and its immediate construction were started. In December 1956, the route towards the mountains was first traced.

On November 8, 1957, the first car of the Loading System arrived at La Aguada, overcoming the natural barriers of the Andean forests. The inauguration was initially set amidst the celebration of the 400th anniversary of the city. Still, it was never made official because of the death of Pius XII. In the end, the system opened to the public in March 1960.

The cable car itself was built in France by 25 different companies, hired by the enterprise Applevage, a specialist in cable cars. Other foreign companies assumed specialized tasks: Eggeca was in charge of the civil works; Egecom was incharge of the metal structures; Sucre-Barret was responsible for essential duties. The first three sections of the Loading cable car were built by the German company Heckel and the last by the Swiss company Habegger.

The Director of the works was Maurice Comte from France, assisted by several professional veterans such as Giovanni Rizzi (from Italy) and Raymond Ruffieux (from Switzerland). Most of the work was performed by workers from Mérida state. Technicians and engineers came from many foreign countries, including Poland, Yugoslavia, Colombia and Haiti. The international contribution was evident until its closure in 2008, as operators would often speak in French rather than Spanish.

Closing And Re-opening
On August 11, 2008, the Venezuelan Ministry of Tourism announced that there would be an indefinite closure of the cable car service to the general public. A conclusive report made by The Doppelmayr Group recommended no further repairs were required to the existing aerial tramway system since it had reached the end of its service life. The construction of a brand new cable car system was underway with a projected opening date in 2012, which was subsequently delayed.

In October 2016, the brand new cable car was opened to the public. Prices vary by date, but as of November 2016, the day-pass is fifty dollars ($50.00) for foreigners or eight thousand bolivares (Bs. 8000) for Venezuelans.

Sections 
 Barinitas Station: Located 1,577 MSL in the city of Mérida.
 La Montaña Station: Located 2,436 MSL.
 La Aguada Station: Located 3,452 MSL.
 Loma Redonda Station: Located 4,045 MSL.
 Pico Espejo Station: Located 4,765 MSL

See also

References

Transport in Venezuela
Aerial tramways in Venezuela
1957 establishments in Venezuela
Sierra Nevada National Park (Venezuela)